Altmann may refer to:

 Altmann (surname)
 Altmann (mountain), a summit of the Appenzell Alps
 Altmann of Passau, bishop (1020–1091)
 Altmann (1905 automobile), an early German automobile
 Republic of Austria v. Altmann, a decision by the US Supreme Court

See also
 Altman (disambiguation)
 Oldman (disambiguation)
 Jungmann
 Jungman